The 2004 London Marathon was the 24th running of the annual marathon race in London, United Kingdom, which took place on Sunday 18 April. The race was the coldest London Marathon in history, and the wettest race in history until it was surpassed in 2020.

The elite men's race was won by Kenya's Evans Rutto in a time of 2:06:18 and the women's race was won in 2:22:35 by Margaret Okayo, also of Kenya. In the wheelchair races, Mexico's Saúl Mendoza (1:36:56) and Italy's Francesca Porcellato (2:04:58) won the men's and women's divisions, respectively. In the mass-participation race, a total of 31,659 runners, 23,265 men and 8,394 women, finished the race.

Competitors
The men's race featured 2003 winner Gezahegne Abera and Evans Rutto, whose debut time at the 2003 Chicago Marathon was the fastest first race time by anyone, and was enough to win the event. Sammy Korir, who had recorded the second fastest marathon of all-time also competed, as did Moroccan world champion Jaouad Gharib. Paul Tergat, the world record holder in the men's marathon, did not compete due to an injury.

The women's race featured Margaret Okayo, who had won two New York City Marathons, and Sun Yingjie was a favourite for the race. Sun had set the third fastest time ever at the 2003 Beijing Marathon. Paula Radcliffe, who won the 2003 race did not compete; she had set the women's marathon world record at that event.

Race summary

The elite and wheelchair races started in dry conditions, though the course became wet later on.

The men's race was won by Kenyan Evans Rutto. Sammy Korir finished second and Jaouad Gharib finished third. During the race, Rutto fell on a cobblestone section near to the Tower of London and brought down Korir; the 2005 race was rerouted to avoid these cobblestones. At the time, Rutto's time of 2:06:18 was the best finishing time for a marathon that year. Rutto was not selected in the Kenyan team for the 2004 Summer Olympics, as Korir was chosen instead. Jon Brown was the highest place British finisher, and he finished faster than the Olympic qualifying time.

The women's race was won by Kenyan Margaret Okayo, ahead of Lyudmila Petrova in second, and Constantina Diță in third. It was the first time that Kenyan athletes had won both the men's and women's London Marathon events in the same year. Diță was overtaken in the closing stages of the race. Tracey Morris was the highest finishing Briton in the race; as a result, she was selected for the British marathon team for the 2004 Summer Olympics, alongside Paula Radcliffe and Liz Yelling.

The men's wheelchair race was won by Mexican Saúl Mendoza, with David Weir finishing second. During the race, Mendoza accidentally followed a police motorbike which diverted him away from the course.

The women's wheelchair race was won by Italian Francesca Porcellato for the second successive year. Briton Paula Craig finished second, with Swedish debutant Gunilla Wallengren finishing third.

Non-elite race

The mass-participation event had three start points. The races from those locations were started by former runner Roger Bannister, rugby union player Jonny Wilkinson and then IAAF president Lamine Diack respectively. A total of 108,000 people applied to enter the race: 45,219 had their applications accepted and 32,746 started the race. A total of 31,659 runners, 23,265 men and 8,394 women, finished the race. Finishers included Fauja Singh, who was aged 93, and finished in a time of 6:07:13. Singh was the oldest finisher at any London Marathon.

Emmerdale star Tony Audenshaw was the first celebrity to finish, and other notable celebrity participants included chefs Gordon Ramsay and Michel Roux, as well as jockey Richard Dunwoody, former cricketer Graham Gooch, former swimmer Adrian Moorhouse, former England football manager Graham Taylor, former leader of the Conservative Party Iain Duncan Smith and politician Jeffrey Archer.

Results
Note: Only the top 20 finishers are listed.

Men

Women

Wheelchair men

Wheelchair women

References

Results
Results. Association of Road Racing Statisticians. Retrieved 2020-04-18.

External links

Official website

2004
London Marathon
Marathon
London Marathon